Eric Jenkins (born November 24, 1991) is a professional distance runner. He first began running at Portsmouth High School in his hometown, after which he was recruited by Northeastern University. After his junior year Jenkins transferred to University of Oregon, where he further established his reputation in collegiate distance running. After his collegiate career he signed a contract with Nike. He formerly ran with the Nike Oregon Project.

Running career

High school
Jenkins first ran competitively in cross country while in middle school. He then attended Portsmouth High School in New Hampshire, although he did not run all of the four years he attended. In his senior year of high school he recorded a personal best time of 4:15.10 in the 1600 meters.

Collegiate
Jenkins first enrolled in Northeastern University, where he made an immediate impact for the school's cross country team when he placed third overall at the 2011 CAA Cross Country Championships. In Jenkins' first semesters at Northeastern, the head coach was Renny Waldron, who noticed that he would start out too fast to finish strong in many of his freshman races. By Jenkins' junior year, Northeastern's cross country and track program went through widespread staff changes and new coaches were hired. Jenkins set Northeastern's indoor mile, 3000-meter, and 5000-meter records.

In the summer of 2013, Jenkins transferred to the University of Oregon. While a student and runner with Oregon, he won the men's 3K and 5K at the 2015 NCAA DI Indoor T&F Championships. During this time, a famous rivalry formed between him and his teammate Edward Cheserek, who would always finish either closely behind or ahead of Jenkins in several races.

Eric is a two-time NCAA indoor champion; All-America honors every year in track and cross country; NCAA cross country runner-up, three NCAA track team titles, and the second-fastest 5,000 in NCAA history.) After graduating in June, Jenkins signed with Nike and headed to Europe, where he notched personal bests in the 3,000 meters (7:41.79) as well as in the 5,000 (13:07.33).

Professional

In June 2015, Jenkins signed with Nike and Flynn Sports Management. During his first summer as a professional runner, he got into the Belgian racing circuit, participating in two high-profile track meets. In Kortrijk, he ran the 1500 meters, and in Heusden he ran the 5000 meters and fulfilled the Olympic "A" standard in the process with his 13:07 result.

On February 5, 2016, Jenkins recorded a time of 3:42:32 over 1500 meters House of Track meeting in Portland. Two weeks later he ran a personal record over 3000 meters during the Millrose Games in New York, his time of 7:39:43 was good for 3rd place in the race that was won by Ryan Hill in 7:38:82.

On May 27, Jenkins competed in the 10,000 meters event at the Prefontaine Classic. He finished in 27:48.02 to achieve the 2016 Olympic qualifying standard. Later he placed fourth in the 5000 m at the U.S. Olympic Trials and failed to qualify.

On September 3, 2016, Jenkins won the Fifth Avenue Mile in a time of 3:49.5, narrowly defeating the previous year's winner, Matt Centrowitz, by 0.1 seconds.

On January 14, 2017, Jenkins won the Seattle UW Preview Mile in 3:58.68.

On February 11, 2017, Jenkins won the Millrose Games Wanamaker Mile with a time of 3:53.23, he defeated Olympic bronze medalist Clayton Murphy by over a second. This was Jenkins' first Wanamaker title.

On February 26, Jenkins finished second at the Boston BU Last Chance Meet in 13:05.85. Jenkins’ effort was the top time in the United States in 2017.

On May 7, 2017, Jenkins won the Payton Jordan Invitational 1500m in 3:38.30, outdistancing top Americans such as Evan Jager, Izaic Yorks, and Brandon Kidder.

On May 18, 2017, Jenkins won the Los Angeles USATF Distance Classic in 3:36.51.

On June 11 Jenkins won the Portland Track Festival in 3:37.55. In doing so he beat out many talented domestic competitors, such as Sam Prakel, Lopez Lomong, Riley Masters, and Ryan Hill.

On June 23, Jenkins finished second in the USATF Championships 5000m final behind Paul Chelimo to qualify for the 2017 IAAF World Championships in Athletics.

On July 22, 2017, Jenkins placed 6th at the Heusden-Zolder KBC Night of Athletics 1500m in Belgium in 3:37.92.

Jenkins’ race result at the Heusden-Zolder KBC Night of Athletics ended a nearly ten month long undefeated streak at 1500m and Mile distance races, including a Wanamaker Mile and Fifth Avenue Mile title and wins the reigning Olympic 1500m Champion Matthew Centrowitz and Olympic 800m bronze medalist Clayton Murphy.

On August 9, 2017, Jenkins finished tenth in his heat of the 5000m at the 2017 IAAF World Championships.

References

Northeastern Huskies men's track and field athletes
Oregon Ducks men's track and field athletes
1991 births
People from Portsmouth, New Hampshire
Living people
World Athletics Championships athletes for the United States
American male long-distance runners
Sportspeople from Rockingham County, New Hampshire